Book review is a form of literary criticism in which a book is analyzed based on content, style, and merit.

Book Review may refer to:

American Book Review
Australian Book Review
Black Issues Book Review
Electronic Book Review
Midwest Book Review
Swedish Book Review
The New York Times Book Review
Weekly Comic Book Review
Wenhui Book Review

See also
Book Revue (cartoon short), later re-issued as Book Review, a Looney Tunes cartoon short featuring Daffy Duck
Book Review Index
Review of Books (disambiguation)